The Spectrometer Telescope for Imaging X-rays (STIX) is one of the 10 instruments that are part of the scientific payload for the ESA Solar Orbiter mission, to be launched in 2020.
 
The STIX instrument is an X-ray imaging spectrometer, whose purpose is to study the extremely hot solar plasma and the high-energy electrons accelerated during a solar flare. It can detect X-rays from 4 to 150 keV and exploits an indirect imaging technique based on the moiré effect, to produce images with few arcsec angular resolution in any given energy range.

The instrument has been developed by an international collaboration led by the University of Applied Sciences and Arts Northwestern Switzerland.

External links 
 STIX Data Center
 The spectrometer/telescope for imaging X-rays on board the ESA Solar Orbiter spacecraft
 ESA Solar Orbiter

European Space Agency space probes
Solar telescopes
Spacecraft instruments